Made in Mexico is a television series that follows the lives of nine young socialites and expats living in Mexico City.

Its first season premiered on Netflix in 2018, with eight episodes.

Although there were news reports about a second season, it was never broadcast.

References

External links 
 Made in Mexico on Netflix
 

Mexican television series
Spanish-language Netflix original programming